His Daughter is Called Peter (German: Seine Tochter ist der Peter) is a 1955 Austrian drama film directed by Gustav Fröhlich and starring Sabine Eggerth, Wolf Albach-Retty and Josef Meinrad. The film was a remake of a 1936 Austrian film of the same name. Both films were based on a novel by Edith Zellweker.

It was made at the Schönbrunn Studios in Vienna.

Cast

References

Bibliography 
 Fritsche, Maria. Homemade Men in Postwar Austrian Cinema: Nationhood, Genre and Masculinity. Berghahn Books, 2013.

External links 
 

1955 films
Austrian drama films
1955 drama films
1950s German-language films
Films based on Swiss novels
Remakes of Austrian films
Films directed by Gustav Fröhlich 
Schönbrunn Studios films
Austrian black-and-white films